Santa Teresa Club Deportivo is a Spanish women's football club based in Badajoz (Extremadura). Founded in 1998, it plays in the Segunda División Pro, holding home games at Estadio El Vivero, with a 1,500-seat capacity.

History

Founded in 1998, Santa Teresa promoted to Segunda División in 2011, after winning the Extremadura Group of the Regional Leagues. Three years later, the club promoted to the top tier after beating Sporting Plaza de Argel in the last round of the promotion playoffs.

On 27 February 2017, the club approved to start its conversion into Sociedad Anónima Deportiva, becoming the first women's football club in Spain to do it since the creation of the SADs in 1990.

Season by season

Honours
 Regional Championship
 2011
 Segunda División
 2014, 2019
 Segunda División Pro
 2020

Players

Current squad
As of 2 July 2020

Reserve team

References

External links
Official website
Twitter

Women's football clubs in Spain
Sport in Badajoz
Primera División (women) clubs
 
Football clubs in Extremadura
Segunda Federación (women) clubs